Síle Ní Bhraonáin, Irish television presenter, born Connemara, 1983.

Ní Bhraonain is a native of An Spidéal, Connemara and presenter of TG4's "Sile Show" since 2005. Her career at TG4 began about a year out of school with a phone call she received while she was doing a local FÁS computer course. She has hosted Gradam Ceoil awards.

References

 Galway Now, May 2006

External links
 http://images.google.ie/images?client=firefox-a&rls=org.mozilla:en-US:official&channel=s&hl=en&source=hp&q=S%C3%ADle+N%C3%AD+Bhraonain&um=1&ie=UTF-8&ei=CavgSq-ROqbkmwPwmNimAg&sa=X&oi=image_result_group&ct=title&resnum=1&ved=0CBIQsAQwAA
 http://www.independent.ie/business/personal-finance/me-amp-my-money--siacutele-niacute-bhraonin-83014.html

People from County Galway
1983 births
20th-century Irish people
21st-century Irish people
Living people
TG4 presenters